The Tiger Akbar is a 1951 West German thriller film directed by Harry Piel and starring Piel, Friedl Hardt and Hilde Hildebrand.

Cast

References

Bibliography 
 Goble, Alan. The Complete Index to Literary Sources in Film. Walter de Gruyter, 1999.

External links 
 

1951 films
1950s thriller films
German thriller films
West German films
1950s German-language films
Films directed by Harry Piel
Circus films
Films about tigers
Films based on German novels
German black-and-white films
1950s German films